D52 highway, formerly Expressway R52 is a highway in the South Moravian Region of the Czech Republic, currently leading from Modřice, about  south of Brno, to Pohořelice, parallel to the Highway D2. It forms part of the European road E461.

Sections of the expressway:

From Pohořelice the ordinary road No. 52 runs further southwards to the border with Austria at Mikulov. According to a 2009 treaty between the Czech Republic and Austria, it is to be completed as an expressway and continuous connection between Brno and the Austrian A5 North Autobahn at Drasenhofen, leading to Vienna. Within the agglomeration of Brno plans for a new route intend to relocate the R52 running from the Rajhrad junction northwestwards bypassing the city centre to reach the Highway D1 and the Expressway R43 at Troubsko.

Parts of the expressway were built on sections of the former Strecke 88 Autobahn constructed between 1939 and 1942 during the German occupation of Czechoslovakia as part of a connection between Breslau (Wrocław) and Vienna, colloquially called Hitlerova dálnice ("Hitler's highway").

Gallery

References

External links 

 Information on dalnice-silnice.cz 
Information on motorway.cz

R52
Proposed roads in the Czech Republic